Ambalapravu is a 1970 Indian Malayalam film,  directed by P. Bhaskaran and produced by T. C. Barjathya. The film stars Prem Nazir, Sheela, Madhu and Sharada in the lead roles. The film had musical score by M. S. Baburaj.

Cast

Prem Nazir as Udhaya Varma
Sheela as Sharadha
Madhu as Rajendran
Sharada as Indumathi
Adoor Bhasi as Shankara Pilla
Kottayam Santha as Nani Amma
P. J. Antony as Menon
Sankaradi as Dhamu
T. R. Omana as Subhadra Thamburatti
Abbas
Aranmula Ponnamma as Saraswathi Amma
Bahadoor as Nalinakshan
C. A. Balan as Achutha Warrior
K. P. Ummer as Appunni
Kaduvakulam Antony
Khadeeja as Madhavi
Madhubala
Meena as Rudhrani
K. S. Parvathy as Meenakshi Amma
Paravoor Bharathan
Philomina
Puthuval
Raghava Menon
Raman
Ramankutty as Judge
TKR Bhadran
Veeran as Adhithya Varma

Soundtrack
The music was composed by M. S. Baburaj and the lyrics were written by P. Bhaskaran.

References

External links
 

1970 films
1970s Malayalam-language films
Films directed by P. Bhaskaran